Rock Spring can refer to:

Rock Spring, Georgia
Rock Spring (Shepherdstown, West Virginia)
Rock Spring (California)